Erling Lindboe (18 September 1910 – 24 December 1973) was a Norwegian speed skater.

He competed at the 1932 Winter Olympics in Lake Placid, in the 500 metres and the 5000 metres.

References

External links

1910 births
1973 deaths
Norwegian male speed skaters
Olympic speed skaters of Norway
Speed skaters at the 1932 Winter Olympics
Sportspeople from Trondheim